Aiken is a Scots-Irish surname, used as a variant to the original Scottish name Aitken. Notable people with it include:

Alastair Aiken (born 1993), British YouTuber known as Ali-A
Amanda L. Aikens (1833–1892), American editor, philanthropist
Andrew J. Aikens (1928–1909), American newspaper publisher and editor
Ann Aiken (born 1951), American judge and attorney
Blair Aiken (born 1956), American stock car racing driver
Brady Aiken (born 1996), American baseball player
C. J. Aiken (born 1990), American basketball player
Carl Aiken (born 1962), English-born reggae singer known as Shinehead
Caroline Aiken (born 1955), American musician
Charles Augustus Aiken (1827–1892), American clergyman and academic
Charles Avery Aiken (1872–1965), American painter
Charles Edward Howard Aiken (1850–1936), American ornithologist
Clay Aiken (born 1978), American singer, actor, activist, and television personality
Conrad Aiken (1889–1973), American writer
Danny Aiken (born 1988), American football player
D. Wyatt Aiken (1828–1887), American army officer and politician
Edmund Aiken (born 1962), English singer and rapper, known as Shinehead
Frank Aiken (1898–1983), Irish politician
Frederick Aiken (1832–1878), American lawyer and journalist
George Aiken (1892–1984), American politician who served as Governor of Vermont
Howard H. Aiken (1900–1973), American physicist
James Aiken (1888–1974), Scottish Canadian politician
Jesse B. Aiken (1808–1900), American musician
Joan Aiken (1924–2004), British novelist
John Macdonald Aiken (1880–1961), Scottish painter
John Aiken (1921–2005), British Royal Air Force officer
John Aiken (born 1932), American ice hockey goaltender
John Aiken (1932–2021), American ice hockey player
John Aiken (born 1950), Irish sculptor
John Aiken (born 1970), New Zealand cricketer
John W. Aiken (1896–1968), American furniture finisher and socialist activist
Kamar Aiken (born 1989), American football player
Kimberly Clarice Aiken (born 1974), American winner of Miss America 1994
Leona S. Aiken, American psychologist
Liam Aiken (born 1990), American actor
Linda Aiken (born 1943), American nursing researcher
Loretta Mary Aiken (1894–1975), American comedian known as Moms Mabley
Miles Aiken (born 1941), American basketball player
Nickie Aiken (born 1969), British politician
Sam Aiken (born 1980), American football player
Simon Aiken, Alastair Aiken's brother
Thomas Aiken (born 1983), South African golfer
Tommy Aiken (born 1946), Northern Irish footballer
William Aiken (1779–1831), Irish American politician
William Aiken Jr. (1806–1887), American politician who served as Governor of South Carolina
William Martin Aiken (1855–1908), American architect

Aikens

Asa Aikens (1788–1863) American attorney, politician, and judge
Andrew J. Aikens (1828–1909), American newspaper publisher
 Johnnie S. Aikens (1914–1986), American politician
 Tom Aikens (born 1970), English chef
 Walt Aikens (born 1991), American football player
 Willie Aikens (born 1954), American baseball player

See also
Aiken (disambiguation)
Aitken (disambiguation)
Akin (disambiguation)
Aiken Drum
Icon the Ungodly
Iken

English-language surnames
Surnames of English origin
Surnames of British Isles origin